This is a list of the Hong Kong national football team results from 1970 to 1989.

1970

1971

1972

1973

1974

1975

1976

1977

1978
No any matches were played in 1978.

1979

1980

1981
No any matches were played in 1981.

1982

1983

1984

1985

1986

1987
No any matches were played in 1987.

1988

1989

References

1970
1970s in Hong Kong sport
1980s in Hong Kong sport